Nikolai Narimanov (born April 10, 1958 in Sverdlovsk) is a Soviet former ice hockey player.

Career
He began his career with HC CSKA Moscow in the Soviet Championship League during the 1976-77 season. In total, Narimanov played 369 games in the Soviet League, the majority of them with Sokil Kyiv. He joined EHC Hamburg of the 2nd Bundesliga in 1989 and spent the remainder of his career playing in the lower-level German leagues, with the exception of 1992-93, when he played for the Italian club HC Bolzano.

Internationally, Narimanov played for the Soviet Union national junior ice hockey team at the 1978 World Junior Ice Hockey Championships.

Career statistics

References

External links
Profile on eurohockey.com

1958 births
Living people
Sportspeople from Yekaterinburg
Russian ice hockey forwards
EV Füssen players
Bolzano HC players
HC CSKA Moscow players
Heilbronner EC players
Sokil Kyiv players
Soviet ice hockey forwards
Soviet expatriate ice hockey players